Pairoj Borwonwatanadilok (born 8 October 1967), simply known as Bae, is a Thai former footballer and a football manager.

Managerial statistics

 Results from penalty shoot-outs are counted as draws in this table.

Honours

Manager
Thailand U-23 Selection 
 BIDC Cup 2013 (Cambodia) Winner (1): 2013

References

1967 births
Living people
Pairoj Borwonwatanadilok
Pairoj Borwonwatanadilok
Pairoj Borwonwatanadilok